is the third Japanese single by French-Canadian singer Himeka. The single was released on May 26, 2010 under her label Sony Music Japan International. "Mirai e..." is the ending theme song for the anime Senkō no Night Raid. The single has a limited edition that contains the Anime Edit version of the leading song "Mirai e...".

Track list

Charts

References

2010 singles
2010 songs
Sony Music Entertainment Japan singles
Song articles with missing songwriters